The 2006 Cherwell District Council election took place on 4 May 2006 to elect members of Cherwell District Council in Oxfordshire, England. One third of the council was up for election and the Conservative Party stayed in overall control of the council.

In total 45 candidates stood in the election competing for the 18 seats which were up for election. The results saw the Conservatives win 15 of the 18 seats contested. They gained 2 seats from Labour in the Banbury wards of Neithrop and Grimsbury and Castle. Their victory in Neithrop was the first time in over 30 years that Labour had not won the ward and saw the first muslim councillor, Alyas Ahmed, elected to Cherwell council. The Liberal Democrats also picked up a seat from Labour in Kidlington South where the Labour group leader on the council, Andrew Hornsby-Smith, stood down at the election. Labour only managed to keep one of their seats in the election, in Banbury Ruscote, where George Parish was re-elected. Turnout in the election ranged from a low of 20% to a high of 51%.

After the election, the composition of the council was:
Conservative 38
Labour 8
Liberal Democrat 4

Election result

Ward results

References

2006 English local elections
2006
2000s in Oxfordshire